The All-Russian Mathematical Portal (better known as Math-Net.Ru) is a web portal that provides extensive access to all aspects of Russian mathematics, including journals, organizations, conferences, articles, videos, libraries, software, and people. The portal is a joint project of the Steklov Mathematical Institute and the Russian Academy of Sciences. Access to information in the portal is generally free, except for the full-text sources of certain publications which have elected to make their content available on a fee basis.

, the All-Russian Mathematical Portal contains links to 108 periodicals, 5106 organizations, over 160,000 mathematical and scientific articles, and over 86,000 people. The website can be read in either Russian or English. As a standard default, it renders on-screen mathematics using MathJax.

See also
MathSciNet
Zentralblatt MATH

References

External links

 

Mathematics websites
Russian Academy of Sciences